The 19th American Society of Cinematographers Awards were held on February 13, 2005, honoring the best cinematographers of film and television in 2004.

Winners

Film
 Outstanding Achievement in Cinematography in Theatrical Releases
 A Very Long Engagement (Un long dimanche de fiançailles) – Bruno Delbonnel

Television
 Outstanding Achievement in Cinematography in Movies of the Week/Mini-Series/Pilot for Network
 Homeland Security – Jonathan Freeman
 Outstanding Achievement in Cinematography in Episodic TV Series
 CSI: Crime Scene Investigation (Episode: "Down the Drain") – Nathan Hope
 Outstanding Achievement in Cinematography in Movies of the Week/Mini-Series/Pilot for Basic or Pay TV
 Iron Jawed Angels – Robbie Greenberg
 Special Achievement Award
 Leonard Maltin
 Lifetime Achievement Award
 Fred J. Koenekamp
 Board of the Governors Award
 Gilbert Cates
 International Award
 Tonino Delli Colli
 President's Award
 Richard Moore

Nominees
 Outstanding Achievement in Cinematography in Theatrical Releases
 The Aviator – Robert Richardson
 Collateral – Dion Beebe and Paul Cameron
 The Passion of the Christ – Caleb Deschanel
 Ray – Paweł Edelman
 Outstanding Achievement in Cinematography in Movies of the Week/Mini-Series/Pilot for Basic or Pay TV
 Frankenstein (Episode: "Part I") – Alan Caso
 The Life and Death of Peter Sellers – Peter Levy
 Salem’s Lot – Ben Nott
 Spartacus – Kees Van Oostrum
 Outstanding Achievement in Cinematography in Movies of the Week/Mini-Series/Pilot for Network
 The Five People You Meet in Heaven – Kramer Morgenthau
 Judas – Michael Goi
 Lost (Episode: "Pilot") – Larry Fong
 Medical Investigation (Episode: "Pilot") – J. Clark Mathis
 Outstanding Achievement in Cinematography in Episodic TV Series
 CSI: NY (Episode: "A Man a Mile") – Chris Manley
 Deadwood (Episode: "Deep Water") – David Boyd
 The Sopranos (Episode: "Long Term Parking") – Alik Sakharov
 The West Wing (Episode: "Gaza") – Thomas Del Ruth

References

2004
2004 film awards
2004 guild awards
2004 television awards